Polygonum microcephalum is a perennial edible shrubs growing up to 0.5m by 0.5m. This species is hermaphrodite (has both male and female organs). It is available in East Asia, Himalayas, Assam Nepal etc.

Regional names include modhuxuleng in Assamese.

References

External links

microcephalum